Andrea Fraunschiel (8 May 1955 – 4 August 2019) was an Austrian politician who was a member of the Federal Council of Austria, member of the  of Burgenland, and mayor of Eisenstadt.

Politics 

On 10 November 1992, Fraunschiel was first elected to the city council of her home town Eisenstadt. From 2002 she held the office of deputy mayor, and on 24 January 2007 she was elected mayor of the city.

In 2004–05 Fraunschiel was a member of the Federal Council, and was then elected to the state parliament of Burgenland in the 2005 elections.

Fraunschiel was a member of the Austrian People's Party (ÖVP). Starting in 2011 she led the ÖVP women's organisation in Burgenland.

She remained mayor of Eisenstadt until November 2011, and was then succeeded by Thomas Steiner. In 2015, the city honoured Fraunschiel by naming her an honorary citizen.

Personal life 

Fraunschiel was born in Eisenstadt in 1955. She studied anglistics and history at the University of Vienna until 1978. She worked in adult education.

Fraunschiel died on 4 August 2019 at the age of 64.

References

External links 
 

1955 births
2019 deaths
People from Eisenstadt
University of Vienna alumni 
Austrian People's Party politicians
Members of the Federal Council (Austria)
Mayors of places in Austria